Gail Hamm (August 19, 1951 – October 24, 2013) was an American politician who served in the Connecticut House of Representatives from the 34th district from 1999 to 2013.

She died of cancer on October 24, 2013, in East Hampton, Connecticut at age 62.

References

1951 births
2013 deaths
Democratic Party members of the Connecticut House of Representatives